Operation Conifer may refer to:

 the 2001 investigation into the murder of Leanne Tiernan
 the police investigation into allegations that Edward Heath was a paedophile